Vasan Healthcare Group is a health care group in India. Founded by A. M. Arun, the group is based in Trichy and has more than 170 eye care hospitals in India and 27 dental Hospitals across 4 states in South India. Company also operates two multi-speciality hospitals in Trichy. Vasan Eye Care Hospitals are day-care centres for treating eye ailments. They started their first hospital in kerala, 2010 at Kozhikode. The corporate office of the hospital is located in Chennai.

History
Vasan Medical Centre, a chain of medical stores, was established at Trichy and Thanjavur in 1947 by late A R Murugaiah, former MP of Karur constituency. His son Dr. A M Arun, the founder of Vasan Healthcare Group, took over the business in 1991 after the sudden demise of his father, established a diagnostic centre and laboratory and later founded two multi-speciality hospitals in Trichy. A M Arun (died 16 November 2020) started the group's first eye care hospital in 2002 in Trichy.

Controversies
In September 2015, a Chennai based chartered accountant S Gurumurthy had alleged that former Finance Minister of India, P. Chidambaram had used firms to launder black money using the Vasan Eye Care hospital chain, which he and his son owned through benami companies.

Insolvent
In 2017, insolvency process was started based on the order of the National Company Law Tribunal in Chennai, India, on a petition filed by Alcon Laboratories (India) Pvt. Ltd., being a supplier. Ater a legal stay sorted for the action in 2017, which lasted till October 2019, the legal proceedings have been started then.

References

External links
Official website

Healthcare in Chennai
Hospital networks in India
Healthcare in Tiruchirappalli
Companies based in Chennai
2002 establishments in Tamil Nadu
Indian companies established in 2002